The Family Resources Survey (FRS) is one of the United Kingdom’s largest household surveys. It is carried out by the Office for National Statistics (ONS) with the National Centre for Social Research (NatCen), and Northern Ireland Statistics and Research Agency (NISRA) on an annual basis, by collecting information on the incomes and characteristics of private households in the United Kingdom. It is sponsored by the Department for Work and Pensions (DWP).

History
The survey was launched in 1992 to supply DWP with the information it required for policy analysis and it has been conducted annually since then. Before 1992, the Department had to rely on other government surveys, for example the Family Expenditure Survey (now established as Living Cost and Food Survey) and the General Household Survey. However their sample sizes proved insufficient for the needs of DWP. 

Beginning with a sample size of about 26,000 households, the number was reduced in 1997 to 24,000 households. After Northern Ireland was included in the sample and a 100% boost was introduced for Scotland, the sample size rose to 29,000 households in 2002 across the UK. In the most recent survey, the sample size was nearly 20,000 households.  

Further changes occurred in 1998 when certain parts of the questionnaire were dropped in order to reduce the length, and in 1999 a system of rotating blocks of questions was introduced to reduce respondent fatigue. As a result, in recent years, the mean time of an interview is approximately 1 hour long, and the questions asked deal with topics such as the receipt of Social Security benefits, assets and savings, housing costs and income.  

In addition, households who take part receive a £10 Post Office voucher, per household, as a token of the FRS’s appreciation. Note that the survey sample excludes those living in hostels, communal areas and care homes, as they are not included in the FRS’s definition of a "private" household.  

At present, the FRS is designated by the UK Statistics Authority as National Statistics. The FRS provides the data for a number of other DWP National Statistics publications: Households Below Average Income, Pensioners’ Incomes Series, and Income-Related Benefits: Estimates of Take-up.

Methodology and scope
The interviews are carried out on a face-to-face basis and all adult residents in a household aged 16 and older are interviewed. The reference period is based on the financial year (April to March) and data is released annually.

Survey results
The DWP reviews the survey results and uses the data from the FRS in its Policy Simulation Model (PSM) in order to evaluate existing policies and costing policy options. The FRS data is released annually, around February/ March, and is covered by a published report which has different chapters to highlight the breadth of information the FRS collects, as well as the change that may have occurred since the previous year’s publication. For 2021, the release date is 25 March. The chapters included are; Income and State Support, Tenure, Disability, Carers, Pensions, Savings & investments and Self-Employment.  

Furthermore, the FRS supplies data which is incorporated in the analysis of patterns of benefit receipt and benefit forecasting. It is also used to analyze income using Households Below Average Income (HBAI) methodology.

References

External links
 Department for Work and Pensions (DWP) website
 National Centre for Social Research (NatCen) website
 Office of National Statistics
 National Statistics

Family economics
Household surveys
Office for National Statistics
Publications established in 1992